John Ford's D-Day footage refers to the motion-picture film reportedly shot by U.S. Coast Guard combat photographers and automated cameras mounted on landing craft under the direction of legendary Hollywood film director John Ford on Omaha Beach and environs during the Normandy landings and Battle of Normandy in summer 1944.

Ford was the head of the U.S. government's Field Photo division. He was in the employ of the Office of Strategic Services, an intelligence section of the U.S. military that was a predecessor to the Central Intelligence Agency. In a 1964 interview with American Legion magazine (on the occasion of the 20th anniversary of Operation Overlord), Ford reported that after landing with the  his team shot "millions of feet" in both color and black-and-white, but "mostly Kodachrome" (color), including near Colleville-sur-Mer. The film was shipped back to the UK and edited in London by a team working 24-hours-a-day in shifts, four hours on, four hours off. Producer Alan Brown supervised the editing, possibly at Denham Studios. Some of Ford's footage was included in documentary films that were shown to Allied leaders of World War II, beginning with Churchill. Copies were also flown to Roosevelt and Stalin. This film had sound and included footage up to D Day plus 5 (June 11); the Allied leaders may have been sent films with a 100-minute runtime. The film sent to the Allied leaders was never released to the public and may be lost but in 2014, the U.S. National Archives surfaced 33 minutes of film on four reels that are likely from this compilation. Upon investigation the Imperial War Museum found it had similar footage. NARA digitized these four reels and uploaded the footage to the Internet. 

Meanwhile, some of the Ford-supervised color footage of the Normandy landings was converted to black and white for use in newsreels released by Movietone and Pathé. It also appeared in government documentaries including United States Coast Guard Report Number 4: Normandy Invasion. Ford's most effective contribution to the documentary record of D-Day was apparently his notion to install camera mounts and automated cameras to the front of vehicles, tanks and landing craft. There were 500 Eyemo cameras, each loaded with four minutes of 35 mm movie film. 

According to the 1964 interview with Ford, very little of the footage he produced was ever released to the public, in part because images of dead Allied soldiers were considered bad for both military and civilian morale. Yet as of 1964—according to Ford—multiple reels of a John Ford-directed color film of the landings at Omaha Beach were still in storage in Anacostia, Washington, District of Columbia.

However, contra his retelling in 1964, film-history researchers believe that Ford probably personally didn't land on a beach until D plus 2 or 3, and per Five Came Back: A Story of Hollywood and the Second World War by Mark Harris, "The cameras jammed, were damaged or captured little of interest." Yet a contemporaneous OSS report stated, "Knowing full well he would be subjected to unusual exposure to enemy fire with- out means to take cover, he personally took charge of the entire operation and was the first of his unit to land...After landing he visited all of his men at their various assignments, and served as a great inspiration by his total disregard of danger in order to get the job done." Ford himself said of his camera operators, who carried no weapons, "Facing the enemy defenseless takes a special kind of bravery."

Circa the 50th anniversary of the landings in 1994, historian Stephen Ambrose reported that the Eisenhower Center had been unable find a John Ford film of Omaha Beach. Rumors abound—was the film dropped in the English Channel by an incompetent major charged with its transport? Did it never exist at all? Is it with the CIA? Is it really just the black-and-white footage from the newsreels even though Ford shot in color for both his Midway Island quasi-documentary and his Pearl Harbor propaganda film? According the Sydney Morning Herald in 2014, "When he was working on the documentary John Ford/John Wayne: The Film-maker and the Legend, Ken Bowser asked the US National Archives if they had any unreleased D-Day footage. They told him some footage was still under lock and key, but he doubts the 100-minute assembly still exists. 'I think it is probably mythological...I think by 1966, Ford had no idea of what the truth was. Those guys were all liars; we know that. They were just tall-tale tellers, and the tales got bigger every year.'"

Joseph McBride's 2011 biography Searching for John Ford suggests that the work product of Ford's Field Photo division owes less to auteur theory than to the workmanlike duties of wartime intelligence work:

The ultimate fate of John Ford's D-Day footage remains unclear; it may be a lost film, it may have always been a tall tale, or it may exist but lie languishing in a half-forgotten secret vault.

References

Further reading
 The New Yorker: Annals of History July 20, 1998 Issue The Color of War By Douglas Brinkley July 12, 1998

Operation Overlord films
1944 in film